The 2017 Marine Harvest Premiership was  the 21st season of the Premier Division, the highest division in Shinty. The season began on 4 March 2017 consisting of 10 teams from across Scotland. The 3rd season with Marine Harvest as title sponsors saw reigning champions Newtonmore challenging for their 8th Premiership title in a row. 

The 2017 Cup competitions competed will be the Camanachd Cup, Macaulay Cup, MacTavish Cup (North District teams only) and the Glasgow Celtic Society Cup (South District teams only).

Any team winning all 4 major trophies for which they are eligible to take part in will achieve the coveted Shinty Grand Slam.

The 2017 Marine Harvest Premiership champions were Kinlochshiel Shinty Club. This was their first Premiership title.

Teams

League summary

League table
Updated 28 July 2018*League points adjustment

Form 
Updated 28 July 2018

Top Scorer(s) 
Top Scorer or Scorers onlyUpdated 28 July 2018

References

Shinty
2017 in Scottish sport